The Lebed (Kuu) is a river in Siberia in eastern Russia, a right tributary of the Biya. Its source is in the Abakan Range (a northern continuation of the Altai Mountains), and it flows through the Altai Republic.

References

Rivers of the Altai Republic